Herbert Howe (September 1893 – October 23, 1959) was a popular Hollywood news writer in the 1920s.

Born in Sioux Falls, South Dakota, Howe was one of the most popular Hollywood news writers of his day during the 1920s and 1930s, writing for early film fan magazine Photoplay.

Closeted in keeping with the times, Howe was a lover of Ramon Novarro, for whom he worked as a publicist/press agent, and a friend of adventure traveller and travel writer Richard Halliburton.

Howe died of pneumonia in Los Angeles in 1959.

References

1893 births
1959 deaths
Journalists from South Dakota
American LGBT writers
Writers from Sioux Falls, South Dakota
Deaths from pneumonia in California
20th-century American journalists
American male journalists
American LGBT journalists
20th-century American LGBT people